Kor Cha (also Romanized as Kor Chā; also known as Kor Chāh) is a village in Farim Rural District, Dodangeh District, Sari County, Mazandaran Province, Iran. At the 2006 census, its population was 144, in 42 families.

References 

Populated places in Sari County